Ali Miguel Sánchez (born January 20, 1997) is a Venezuelan professional baseball catcher in the Arizona Diamondbacks organization. He previously played in Major League Baseball (MLB) for the New York Mets and St. Louis Cardinals.

Career

New York Mets
On July 2, 2013, Sánchez signed with the New York Mets as an international free agent.

In 2014, Sánchez spent the season with the DSL Mets, hitting .303/.406/.394/.800 with three home runs and 24 runs batted in (RBIs). In 2015, Sánchez split the season between the Gulf Coast Mets and the Kingsport Mets, hitting .272/.330/.306/.636 with 20 RBIs. In 2016, Sánchez spent the season with the Brooklyn Cyclones, hitting .216/.260/.275/.535 with 11 RBIs. In 2017, Sánchez played for the Columbia Fireflies, hitting .231/.288/.264/.552 with one home run and 15 RBIs.

In 2018, Sánchez split the season between Columbia and the St. Lucie Mets, combining to hit .265/.294/.387/.681 with six home runs and 38 RBIs. Following the 2018 season, Sánchez played for the Scottsdale Scorpions of the Arizona Fall League. In 2019, Sánchez split the season between the Binghamton Rumble Ponies and the Syracuse Mets, hitting a combined .261/.326/.322/.648 with one home run and three RBIs. Following the 2019 season, Sánchez was added to the Mets 40–man roster.

On August 10, 2020, Sánchez made his MLB debut for the Mets. On February 10, 2021, Sánchez was designated for assignment by the Mets after the team traded for minor league outfielder Khalil Lee.

St. Louis Cardinals
On February 12, 2021, the Mets traded Sánchez to the St. Louis Cardinals in exchange for cash considerations. He was recalled from the Cardinals' alternate training site on April 27, 2021. Sánchez had four at-bats with St. Louis in 2021, going 2-for-4.

Sánchez began the 2022 season with the Triple-A Memphis Redbirds. On June 15, 2022, Sánchez was designated for assignment by the Cardinals.

Detroit Tigers
On June 18, 2022, the Detroit Tigers claimed Sánchez off of waivers from St. Louis and optioned him to the Triple-A Toledo Mud Hens.

Arizona Diamondbacks
On October 18, 2022, Sánchez was claimed off waivers by the Pittsburgh Pirates.

On December 2, 2022, Sánchez was claimed off waivers by the Arizona Diamondbacks. He was designated for assignment on December 23. On January 5, 2023, Sánchez was sent outright to the Triple-A Reno Aces.

References

External links

1997 births
Living people
Binghamton Rumble Ponies players
Brooklyn Cyclones players
Columbia Fireflies players
Dominican Summer League Mets players
Gulf Coast Mets players
Kingsport Mets players
Major League Baseball catchers
Major League Baseball players from Venezuela
New York Mets players
People from Lara (state)
Scottsdale Scorpions players
St. Louis Cardinals players
St. Lucie Mets players
Syracuse Mets players
Venezuelan expatriate baseball players in the United States
Venezuelan expatriate baseball players in the Dominican Republic